The Nongshim Cup is a Go tournament sponsored by Nongshim, an instant noodle food company of South Korea.

Outline 
The Nongshim Cup is a gathering of the best players from South Korea, Japan, and China. The Nongshim Cup is sponsored by Nongshim, an instant noodle food company of South Korea. Each team sends 5 best players to compete. The prize is 500 million Korean Won (approximately $450,000 USD) raised in 2016 from the previous 200 million Korean Won (about $180,000 USD).

Past winners

By nation

Detailed results

18th Nongshim Cup (2016–2017)

Members of the winning team who did not need to play:  Ke Jie,  Tuo Jiaxi,  Lian Xiao

19th Nongshim Cup (2017–2018)

Members of the winning team who did not need to play:  Park Junghwan

20th Nongshim Cup (2018–2019)

Members of the winning team who did not need to play:  Shi Yue,  Gu Zihao,  Ke Jie

21st Nongshim Cup (2019–2020)

The game between Park Junghwan and Fan Tingyu ended in no result because of a technical issue. Park had clicked his mouse to play, but the stone was not placed, and he ran out of time. Officials declared a rematch for the following day, which Park won.

22nd Nongshim Cup (2020–2021)

Members of the winning team who did not need to play:  Park Junghwan

23rd Nongshim Cup (2021–2022)

The game between Mi Yuting and Shin Jin-seo ended in no result because of a technical issue (reminiscent of a similar incident in the 21st cup in 2020). Mi had placed a move, but the computer declared that he ran out of time. Officials declared a rematch for the following day, which Shin won.

24th Nongshim Cup (2022–2023)

References

External links
 Korea Baduk Association archive of the Nongshim Cup (in Korean)
 Nihon Ki-in archive of the Nongshim Cup (in Japanese)

 
Recurring sporting events established in 1999